Hynek Blaško (born 15 July 1955 in Prague) is a Czech general and politician who was elected as a Member of the European Parliament in 2019.

On 14 September 2022 Blaško left Freedom and Direct Democracy due to disagreement with functioning of the party.

On 15 September 2022, he was one of 16 MEPs who voted against condemning President Daniel Ortega of Nicaragua for human rights violations, in particular the arrest of Bishop Rolando Álvarez.

2023 Czech presidential election
On 27 May 2022 Blaško announced his intention to run for the office of President of the Czech Republic in the 2023 election. His presidential bid received support from DSSS. Blaško eventually failed to gather enough signatures and withdrawn from election.

References

MEPs for the Czech Republic 2019–2024
Living people
1955 births
Politicians from Prague
Czech generals
Military personnel from Prague
Candidates in the 2023 Czech presidential election
Freedom and Direct Democracy MEPs
Workers' Party of Social Justice presidential candidates